Arthur Annesley, 11th Viscount Valentia,  (23 August 1843 – 20 January 1927) was a British soldier, courtier and Conservative Party politician. He notably served as Comptroller of the Household between 1898 and 1905.

Background and education
Annesley was the eldest son of the Honourable Arthur Annesley by his wife Flora Mary Macdonald, daughter of Lt. Colonel James Macdonald of Clanranald. His father died when he was one year old and he succeeded his grandfather in the viscountcy in 1863. He was educated at the Royal Military Academy, Woolwich.

Military career
Annesley joined the 10th Hussars in 1864 and was promoted to lieutenant in 1868. He retired from the Army in 1872, but in 1894 was appointed Lieutenant colonel of the Queen's Own Oxfordshire Hussars. In early 1900, Lord Valentia was seconded for service with the Imperial Yeomanry in the Second Boer War, and left for South Africa in the SS Scot in late January. He served as Assistant Adjutant-General for Imperial Yeomanry, with the temporary rank of colonel, and was mentioned in despatches and appointed a Companion of the Order of the Bath (CB) in November 1900 for his services. Upon relinquishing his commission, he was granted, on 1 January 1901, the honorary rank of Colonel in the Army.

Political career
He was appointed High Sheriff of Oxfordshire for 1874–75. The viscountcy of Valentia was an Irish peerage and did not entitle Annesley to an automatic seat in the House of Lords. He was instead elected as the Member of Parliament (MP) for Oxford in 1895, a seat he held until 1917. 

He served as Comptroller of the Household under Lord Salisbury from 1898 to 1902 and under Arthur Balfour from 1902 to 1905. He was appointed a Member of the Royal Victorian Order (MVO) in July 1901. When the coalition government was formed in 1915, Lord Valentia was appointed a Lord in Waiting, a post he held until 1924.

In 1917 he was created Baron Annesley of Bletchington, in the County of Oxford, in the Peerage of the United Kingdom, which entitled him to a seat in the House of Lords. He was made a Knight Commander of the Royal Victorian Order (KCVO) in 1923.

Family
Lord Valentia married, on 30 January 1878, Laura Sarah Webb, daughter of Daniel Hale Webb, of Wykeham Park, Oxfordshire, and widow of Sir Algernon William Peyton, 4th Baronet. They had two sons and six daughters:

Hon. Vere (8 March 1879 – 18 May 1975); married Rev. Guy Ronald Campbell, grandson of John Campbell, 2nd Earl Cawdor.
Hon. Lt. Arthur (24 Aug 1880-16 Nov 1914); unmarried. Killed in action in France.
Hon. Violet Katherine (18 Mar 1882-4 Sep 1963); married Charles Henry Gore, son of Sir Francis Charles Gore. They had a son, and two daughters.
Sir Caryl Arthur (3 Jul 1883-6 Oct 1949); unmarried.
Hon. Helen (30 Jul 1884-21 Jul 1965); married Col. John Pemberton Heywood-Lonsdale. No known issue.
Hon. Lettice (24 Sep 1885–1988); married Capt. Geoffrey Vaux Salvin Bowlby, maternal grandson of Sir David Hunter-Blair, 3rd Baronet.
Hon. Hilda Cecil (19 Apr 1889-20 Sep 1972); unmarried.
Hon. Dorothy (b. 11 May 1892); married Joseph Francis Vaughan Gibbs, maternal descendant of Sir Charles Mordaunt, 6th Baronet and Sir Philip Musgrave, 6th Baronet. They had two daughters.

Death
Lord Valentia died in January 1927, aged 83, and was succeeded by his younger son, the Hon. Caryl Arthur James Annesley, as Lord Valentia's elder son, the Hon. Arthur Annesley, was killed in action in 1914.

Polo
He was the Chairman of the Hurlingham Club Committee and the National Polo Pony Society.

References

Citations

Bibliography
 Ruvigny (Marquess de) (1907). The Plantagenet Roll of the Blood Royal, "Exeter" volume

External links
 

1843 births
1927 deaths
Graduates of the Royal Military Academy, Woolwich
10th Royal Hussars officers
Companions of the Order of the Bath
Knights Commander of the Royal Victorian Order
Annesley, Arthur
Viscounts in the Peerage of Ireland
Annesley, Arthur
Annesley, Arthur
Annesley, Arthur
Annesley, Arthur
Annesley, Arthur
UK MPs who were granted peerages
UK MPs who inherited peerages
Conservative Party (UK) Baronesses- and Lords-in-Waiting
High Sheriffs of Oxfordshire
Arthur
Queen's Own Oxfordshire Hussars officers
Barons created by George V